Tirana 1 is one of the 24 administrative units in Tirana.

Neighborhoods
Ali Demi

References

Tirana 01